North Swindon is a constituency represented in the House of Commons of the UK Parliament since 2010 by Justin Tomlinson, a Conservative.

History
North Swindon was created in 1997 and has been a bellwether since then. However, during the 2010s, the Conservatives did win the constituency by much higher numbers than their national popular vote margin.

Boundaries

1997–2010: The Borough of Thamesdown wards of Blunsdon, Covingham, Gorse Hill, Haydon Wick, Highworth, Moredon, St Margaret, St Philip, Western, and Whitworth, and the District of North Wiltshire ward of Cricklade.

2010–present: The Borough of Swindon wards of Abbey Meads, Blunsdon, Covingham and Nythe, Gorse Hill and Pinehurst, Haydon Wick, Highworth, Moredon, Penhill, St Margaret, St Philip, and Western.

The seat's boundaries encompass an area that before its creation made up parts of the former Swindon constituency and pre-1997 versions of North Wiltshire and Devizes. In the 2010 boundary changes Cricklade became part of the North Wiltshire constituency while this seat acquired parts of the South Swindon constituency.

Constituency profile
The constituency covers much of urban and suburban Swindon, but also incorporates a substantial portion of the surrounding area, including Blunsdon and the market town of Highworth. North Swindon has an electorate of 79,488, the majority of whom live in the suburbs or close to Swindon's town centre.  In 2001 52.9% of homes were into the categories of semi-detached or detached in the Swindon Local Authority area and seeing a 5.0% increase in flats/apartments in 2011 this figure had fallen slightly to 50.3%.  In North Wiltshire a higher proportion of homes are detached (35.1%).  In the same period those registered unemployed rose from 2.5% to 4.2% and those self-employed rose from 6.2% to 7.8%.  In 2010 the unemployment rate for Swindon South was 2.6%, compared to 3.5% in Swindon North.  This is one indicator of social deprivation and compares a rate of 11.0% in Birmingham Ladywood, the constituency with the highest rate nationally.

Members of Parliament

Elections

Elections in the 2010s

Elections in the 2000s

Elections in the 1990s

Neighbouring constituencies

See also
 List of parliamentary constituencies in Wiltshire

Notes

References

Parliamentary constituencies in Wiltshire
Constituencies of the Parliament of the United Kingdom established in 1997
Politics of the Borough of Swindon